The 2022 Engie Open de Biarritz was a professional tennis tournament played on outdoor clay courts. It was the nineteenth edition of the tournament which was part of the 2022 ITF Women's World Tennis Tour. It took place in Biarritz, France between 6 and 12 June 2022.

Champions

Singles

  Mina Hodzic def.  Lucie Nguyen Tan, 6–3, 6–3

Doubles

  Anna Danilina /  Valeriya Strakhova def.  María Carlé /  Maria Timofeeva, 2–6, 6–3, [14–12]

Singles main draw entrants

Seeds

 1 Rankings are as of 23 May 2022.

Other entrants
The following players received wildcards into the singles main draw:
  Océane Babel
  Lucie Nguyen Tan
  Marine Partaud
  Maria Timofeeva

The following players received entry from the qualifying draw:
  Audrey Albié
  Julie Belgraver
  Sara Cakarevic
  Mina Hodzic
  Merel Hoedt
  Margaux Rouvroy
  Lara Salden
  Emily Seibold

References

External links
 2022 Engie Open de Biarritz at ITFtennis.com
 Official website

2022 ITF Women's World Tennis Tour
2022 in French tennis
June 2022 sports events in France